Faurea macnaughtonii (Terblans beech) is a species of tree in the family Proteaceae. It is found in South Africa and Eswatini, and was named in honour of Colin B. MacNaughton, Conservator of Forests at Knysna during the 1890s.

References

macnaughtonii
Conservation dependent plants
Flora of South Africa
Flora of Swaziland
Taxonomy articles created by Polbot